Bair may refer to:

Bair (surname), a surname
Bair Badënov (born 1976), Russian archer
Bair Island, an area in Redwood City, California, United States
Bair, Croatia, a village in Croatia
Bair, Bitola, a quarter of Bitola city, North Macedonia
Bair, Sarawak, a settlement in Sarawak, Malaysia
Bair (fruit)